Health and Care Research Wales is a networked organisation, supported by the Welsh Government, which brings together a wide range of partners across NHS Wales, universities and research institutions, local authorities, and others.

The organisations works in close partnership with other government agencies and research funders; industry partners; patients; public and other stakeholders. Work together to promote research into diseases, treatments, services and outcomes that can lead to discoveries and innovations which can improve and even save people's lives.

Vision, aims and objectives 
Health and Care Research Wales' goal is to ensure that today's research makes a difference to tomorrow's care.

Health and Care Research Wales’ mission is to promote, support and provide collective oversight of health and social care research in Wales to ensure it is of the highest international scientific quality, is relevant to the needs and challenges of health and care in Wales, and makes a difference to policy and practice in ways that improve the lives of patients, people and communities in Wales.

Involving patients, service users, carers and the public is key to our work in order to ensure the research we support is relevant and effectively delivered.

References

Medical and health organisations based in Wales
Research organisations based in Wales